Dartford Football Club is an English association football club based in Dartford, Kent. The club participates in the Conference Premier, the fifth tier of English football.

Home matches are played at the club's environmentally friendly stadium, Princes Park, opened in November 2006. The club was formed in 1888 by members of the Dartford Working men's club. Dartford's best performances in the FA Cup came in 1936 and 1937 when they reached the 3rd round of the competition and their best in recent times was when they reached the 1st round in 2010–11 season where they gained a replay. They have also reached the final of the FA Trophy once.

Key
Top scorer and number of goals scored shown in bold when he was also top scorer for the division.

Key to league record
 Level = Level of the league in the current league system
 Pld = Games played
 W = Games won
 D = Games drawn
 L = Games lost
 GF = Goals for
 GA = Goals against
 GD = Goals difference
 Pts = Points
 Position = Position in the final league table

Key to cup records
 PR = Premilinary round
 QR1 = Qualifying round 1
 QR2 = Qualifying round 2
 QR3 = Qualifying round 3
 QR4 = Qualifying round 4
 R1 = Round 1
 R2 = Round 2
 R3 = Round 3
 R4 = Round 4
 R5 = Round 5
 R6 = Round 6
 QF = Quarter-finals
 SF = Semi-finals
 RU = Runners-up
 W = Winners

 Average home attendance = for league games only

Seasons

References

English football club seasons